Knut Atle Selberg (born 1949, in Norway) is a planner, architect, and urban designer with the Selberg Arkitektkontor AS since 1996.

Selberg received his BS in architecture in 1973, his diploma in architecture in 1975, and his Diploma in Urban Design in 1976 at Scot Sutherland School of Architecture at Garthdee School of Engineering, Aberdeen, Scotland.

Selberg Arkitektkontor is a multi-discipline company working in the fields of planning, landscaping, architecture, and analysis.

Architectural Projects
IKEA Store Leangen, Norway - the largest IKEA store in Norway at 25.000m2 (1996-2002)
Lerkendal stadion for the Norwegian football club Rosenborg BK (1996-2002)

Traffic and road design
E6 Project - Melhus, Sør-Trøndelag, Norway (1996-2003)
Urban design and environmental plan for 2 main roads into Trondheim, Norway (1996-2003)
 Oslo Tunnel (1985-1990)

Bridges
Leonardo Bridge Ås, Norway - part of the Vebjørn Sand Da Vinci Project (1996-2001)
Vallsundet Bridge Östersund, Sweden - nominated to “The building of the year” in Sweden in 1999 (1995-1998)
Askøy Bridge - Bergen to Askøy (1991-1996)
Evenstad Bridge - spans the river Glomma (1993-1997)

Footnotes

References
 Knut Selberg. Nicholas Janberg's Structurae. Accessed 2011-01-31.

External links
Selberg Arkitektkontor
Lerkendal football stadium details

20th-century Norwegian architects
1949 births
Living people
21st-century Norwegian architects